Henry Laurens Hopkins (July 12, 1805 – 1870) was a nineteenth century American politician from Virginia.

Early life
Hopkins was born in Goochland County, Virginia near Goochland Court House, the a son of the Episcopal minister Charles Hopkins. He studied law in his home county.

Career

As an adult, Hopkins established a law practice in Powhatan County, Virginia, There he served as a Commonwealth’s Attorney for many years.

Hopkins served as a Delegate in the Virginia Assembly from Powhatan County and was elected Speaker of the House of Delegates 1848-1850. He also served in another Constitutional office as a member of the Council of State and acting Governor for a year. He was succeeded by his brother, George Washington Hopkins of Washington County, Virginia.

In 1850, Hopkins was elected to the Virginia Constitutional Convention of 1850. He was one of three delegates elected from the Southside delegate district made up of his home district of Brunswick County, as well as Lunenburg, Nottoway and Dinwiddie Counties.

Hopkins moved to Petersburg in 1859. During the American Civil War, he served under the Confederate regime as a member of the House of Delegates from 1862 to 1863.

Death
Henry L. Hopkins died in near Wilmington, North Carolina in 1870.

References

Bibliography
List of former Speakers of the House of Delegates, in the old House chamber in the Virginia State Capitol

Members of the Virginia House of Delegates
People from Goochland County, Virginia
Speakers of the Virginia House of Delegates
1805 births
1870 deaths
19th-century American politicians
People from Powhatan County, Virginia